Hedge schools (Irish names include  scoil chois claí, scoil ghairid and scoil scairte) were small informal secret and illegal schools, particularly in 18th- and 19th-century Ireland, designed to secretly provide the rudiments of primary education to children of 'non-conforming' faiths (Catholic and Presbyterian). Under the penal laws only schools for those of the Anglican faith were allowed. Instead Catholics and Presbyterians set up secret and illegal schools that met in private homes.

History 
After the 16th and 17th century dispossession, emigration, and outlawry of the Irish clan chiefs and the loss of their patronage, the teachers and students of the schools that for centuries had trained composers of Irish bardic poetry adapted, according to Daniel Corkery, by becoming teachers at secret and illegal Catholic schools, which doubled as minor seminaries for the increasingly illegal and underground Catholic Church in Ireland.

While the "hedge school" label suggests the classes took place next to a hedgerow, classes were normally held in a house or a barn. Payment was generally made to teachers per subject, and bright pupils would often compete locally with their teachers, or even be smuggled to Mainland Europe, for Catholic higher education at one of the Irish Colleges.

Subjects included the reading, writing and grammar of both the Irish and English languages, and maths (the fundamental "three Rs"). In some schools, the Irish bardic poetry, local history and home economics were also taught. In Munster especially, Greek and Latin were also taught. In Westminster a parliamentarian complained 'I do not wish to see children [in Ireland] educated like the inhabitants [of Munster], where the young peasants of Kerry run about in rags with a Cicero or Virgil under their arms". Reading was often taught using chapbooks, sold at village fairs and typically filled with exciting stories of well-known rapparees; outlawed members of the Gaelic nobility of Ireland who still held to the code of conduct of the traditional chiefs of the Irish clans.

While all Catholic education was forbidden under the penal laws from 1723 to 1782, no hedge teachers are known to have been prosecuted. Indeed, official records were made of hedge schools by censusmakers, such as that in County Clare. The penal laws particularly targeted Catholic schools run by religious orders, whose property was routinely confiscated. The laws were intended to force Irish Catholics of all classes to convert to the Protestant Church of Ireland if they wanted a decent education.

Historians agree that the hedge schools provided education, occasionally at a very high level, for up to 400,000 students by the mid-1820s. J. R. R. Adams says the hedge schools testified “to the strong desire of ordinary Irish people to see their children receive some sort of education”. Antonia McManus argues that there “can be little doubt that Irish parents set a high value on a hedge school education and made enormous sacrifices to secure it for their children....[the hedge schoolteacher was] one of their own”.

Formal schools for Catholics under trained teachers began to appear after 1800. Edmund Ignatius Rice (1762–1844) founded two religious institutes of religious brothers: the Congregation of Christian Brothers and the Presentation Brothers. Both opened numerous schools, which were visible, legal and standardized. Discipline was notably strict.

Hedge schools declined from the foundation of the national school system by the British government in the 1830s. Most of the Catholic bishops preferred the new system, as the new schools would be largely under the control of the Catholic Church and would allow formalized teaching of Catholic doctrine. James Doyle, Bishop of Kildare and Leighlin, wrote to his priests in 1831:

A study of hedge schools by Yolanda Fernández-Suárez of the University of Burgos found that hedge schools existed into the 1890s and suggested that the schools existed as much from rural poverty and a lack of resources as from religious oppression.  Marianne Eliott also mentioned that they were used by the poor and not only by Catholics.

After 1900, historians such as Daniel Corkery tended to emphasise the hedge schools' classical studies (in Latin and Greek). Those studies were sometimes taught (based on a local demand) but not in every school.

Fernández-Suárez quoted a Board of Education inspector visiting a school in 1835:

In popular culture

 Brian Friel's play Translations is set in a hedge school, and its subject is the defence of Irish culture against a dominant and aggressive colonialism.
 William Makepeace Thackeray's Irish Sketch Books contain various references to hedge schools.
 William Carleton, who got his own early education in hedge schools, wrote many comedic accounts of them for the English audience, including The Hedge School.

See also
 Richard Gwyn
 Brian Merriman
 Donnchadh Ruadh Mac Conmara

References

Further reading

 Adams, J.R.R. "The Hedge Schools and popular education in Ireland". Chapter 5 in Irish Popular Culture 1650–1850 edited by J Donnelly & K Miller, Irish Academic Press 1999,  
 Marianne Elliott, The Catholics of Ulster, Penguin 2001, at pp. 179–181.
 Fernández-Suárez, Yolanda. "An Essential Picture in a Sketch-Book of Ireland: The Last Hedge Schools", Estudios Irlandeses 
 Lyons, Tony. "The Hedge Schools Of Ireland." History 24#6 (2016).  pp 28–31 online
 McManus,  Antonia. The Irish Hedge School and Its Books, 1695–1831 (2002)

External links
 National Archives materials on the start of the National Schools in 1831

Alternative education
History of education in Ireland
Schools in Ireland
School types
Social history of Ireland
Underground education